Patrick "Toole Time" O'Toole (born December 24, 1971 in Toronto, Ontario) is an assistant coach for the Rochester Knighthawks in the National Lacrosse League and a retired goaltender. O'Toole was named NLL Goaltender of the Year in 2003.

In 1998, as a member of the Brampton Excelsiors, O'Toole was awarded the Mike Kelly Memorial Trophy as most valuable player in the Mann Cup competition.

In 2010, O'Toole became the NLL all-time saves leader with 6,464.

He is one of the 2022 inductee list for the Brampton Sports Hall of Fame.

Statistics

NLL

Awards

References

External links 
 Pat O'Toole on the Rochester Knighthawks official web site.

1971 births
National Lacrosse League All-Stars
Canadian lacrosse players
Lacrosse people from Ontario
Living people
Rochester Knighthawks players
Buffalo Bandits players
Sportspeople from Toronto
National Lacrosse League major award winners